Arun District Council in West Sussex, England is elected every four years. Since the last boundary changes in 2015, 54 councillors have been elected from 23 wards.

Political control
The first elections to the council were held in 1973, initially acting as a shadow authority before coming into its powers on 1 April 1974. From 1973 the council had been controlled by the Conservative Party, but in 2019 for the first time in 46 years they were no longer the majority party. Later in 2019 the Conservatives became the largest party, and following two by-election victories in May 2021 they retook the leadership of the council, although the council remains under no overall control, with no one party having a majority of the seats.

Leadership
The leaders of the council since 2002 have been:

Council elections
1973 Arun District Council election
1976 Arun District Council election
1979 Arun District Council election
1983 Arun District Council election (New ward boundaries)
1987 Arun District Council election (District boundary changes took place but the number of seats remained the same)
1991 Arun District Council election
1995 Arun District Council election
1999 Arun District Council election
2003 Arun District Council election (New ward boundaries)
2007 Arun District Council election
2011 Arun District Council election
2015 Arun District Council election (New ward boundaries)
2019 Arun District Council election

Overview

Election results

Composition of the council

District result maps

By-election results

Overview

1995-1999

1999-2003

2003-2007

2007-2011

2011-2015

2015-2019

2019-2023

References 

 By-election results

External links
Arun District Council

 
Local government in West Sussex
Arun District
Council elections in West Sussex